P. ginsengisoli may refer to:

Paraburkholderia ginsengisoli, a Gram-negative bacterium.
Paralcaligenes ginsengisoli, a Gram-negative bacterium.
Pedobacter ginsengisoli, a Gram-negative bacterium.
Phycicoccus ginsengisoli, a Gram-positive bacterium.
Pusillimonas ginsengisoli, a Gram-negative bacterium.